Darko Boateng Gyabi (born 18 February 2004) is an English professional footballer who plays as a midfielder for Premier League club Leeds United.

Club career
Having played for Cray Wanderers between the ages of 8 and 11, Gyabi joined Millwall in 2015. In 2018, Gyabi left to join the academy of Manchester City. He played for City's under-21 side in three EFL Trophy games during the 2020-2021 season.

On 4 July 2022, Gyabi joined Leeds United on a four-year contract for a £5 million transfer fee in part of a swap deal involving Kalvin Phillips. On 9 November 2022 he made his debut for Leeds in the EFL Cup against Wolverhampton Wanderers. The next month saw him make his Premier League debut on 28 December 2022 in the 3-1 defeat to Manchester City as a second-half substitute.

International career
Gyabi is of Ghanaian descent.

In September 2021, Gyabi made his debut representing the England under-18 team.

On 21 September 2022, Gyabi made his England U19 debut during a 2-0 2023 U19 Euro qualifying win over Montenegro.

Style of play
Gyabi is right footed and plays mainly as a box-to-box midfielder; he has been described as being a player who catches the eye with his skill in tight areas with ability to dribble through midfield.

Career statistics

Club

References

External links
 

2004 births
Living people
Cray Wanderers F.C. players
Manchester City F.C. players
Leeds United F.C. players
English footballers
Association football midfielders
England youth international footballers
Black British sportspeople
People from London
Footballers from Catford
English sportspeople of Ghanaian descent
Premier League players